Marvin Newton Morgan (13 April 1983 – 6 December 2021) was an English professional footballer who played as a forward. He played in the Football League for Aldershot Town, Dagenham & Redbridge, Shrewsbury Town, Plymouth Argyle and Hartlepool United. He was also the founder of the fashion brand Fresh Ego Kid.

Career

Non-League

Born in Manchester, Morgan started his career in the youth team at Wealdstone before signing a contract in March 2000, and becoming the club's youngest ever goalscorer against Leatherhead a month later. Morgan also had two loan spells at Berkhamsted Town, making a total of eight appearances. Morgan started Wealdstone's 2004 playoff final victory against Dulwich Hamlet and made a total of 187 appearances in his first spell at the club, scoring 56 times. He joined Yeading in November 2004 for a fee of £3,000 and scored eight league goals that season as Yeading won the Isthmian League Premier Division. In the 2006–07 season, Morgan scored 25 goals for Yeading and was the club's top scorer. Whilst at Yeading, he was nicknamed "The Sticks". Morgan played in 94 league games during three seasons with the club and scored 39 goals. In May 2007, he joined the Conference National side Woking.

Football League
In May 2008, Morgan signed for the Conference National champions and newly promoted League Two side Aldershot Town for an undisclosed fee. This fee although undisclosed, was a record fee paid by Aldershot Town for any player. Morgan made his Football League debut in Aldershot Town's first-ever Football League match, away to Accrington Stanley on 9 August 2008. He scored Aldershot Town's first-ever League Cup goal in the 3–1 defeat at Coventry City in the first round of the 2008–09 competition. He scored his first Football League goal at home to Bradford City on 30 August 2008. Morgan finished season 2008–09 at the Shots having scored seven goals in all competitions. He played in all but seven games in season 2009–10 and finished the campaign having top-scored with 16 goals in all competitions.

Controversy
After the 2–1 defeat to Hereford United on 3 January 2011, Morgan posted the following message on Twitter: "Like to thank the fans who booed me off the pitch. Where's that going to get you! I hope you all die." Following that, he was transfer-listed, being eventually signed by League One club Dagenham & Redbridge on loan until the end of the season. At the end of the season, he was one of seven players to be released by Aldershot Town.

Shrewsbury Town
Morgan joined Shrewsbury Town following his release from Aldershot and started the opening game of the League Two season against Plymouth Argyle on 6 August 2011. He was replaced by Terry Gornell in the 88th minute following a knock to the head. Three days later, in Shrewsbury's Football League Cup encounter with Derby County, Morgan scored two goals to help his side to a 3–2 away win.

At the end of the 2011–12 season Morgan had scored 11 goals to help in Shrewsbury Town's promotion to League One. He was released at the end of the 2012–13 season having only scored seven goals.

Plymouth Argyle
Morgan signed a two-year contract with Plymouth Argyle in July 2013, and made his debut in the club's first game of the new season at Southend United.

On 17 August 2013, Morgan scored his first goal for Argyle heading home The Pilgrims' first in 3–1 win away at Cheltenham Town. This however was to be Morgan's only goal of the 2013–14 season as shoulder surgery forced him to sit out four months of the campaign, and a 'mini-seizure' brought his season to a premature end.

Morgan scored his first goal of the 2014–15 season in a 2–0 win over Hartlepool United on 20 September 2014 and celebrated the goal in the style of Bebeto as a tribute to his son who was born earlier in the week. Morgan doubled his tally for the whole of the previous season on 8 November 2014, scoring Argyle's second in the 2–0 win over AFC Fylde in the FA Cup first round.

On 2 February 2015, Morgan signed for Hartlepool on loan until the end of the season. He played 5 times for the Pools, with his only goal coming in a 1–0 home win over Northampton Town on 10 February. He was released by Plymouth at the end of the season.

Return to non-League
Following his release from Plymouth, Morgan returned to non-League football, joining Havant & Waterlooville of the National League South in June 2015. He re-joined former club Wealdstone on loan in February 2016, and then secured a full season loan to Bath City ahead of the following season. He re-signed with Bath City in July 2017. On 20 June 2018, Morgan signed for Hendon. Morgan was released by the club on 25 October 2018, following an incident involving fellow player Laste Dombaxe and a machete. Later that season Morgan played for Beaconsfield Town and Potters Bar Town. The following season, he played for Wingate & Finchley and Hornchurch before returning to Potters Bar.

Personal life
Morgan was in a 14 year relationship with Jerri Fletcher prior to his death.  Their son was seven years old when Morgan died.

Morgan collapsed twice in April 2014, while a Plymouth player. He was diagnosed with cavernoma, an abnormality of blood vessels in the brain. He required medication for the rest of his life.

Morgan set up Fresh Ego Kid, a streetwear fashion brand, whilst at Shrewsbury Town. Which he regularly promoted on his social channels. The brand has become a favourite of footballers and celebrities including Romelu Lukaku, Kieran Trippier, Harry Maguire, Cruz Beckham, Marvin Humes and Aston Merrygold.  Fresh Ego Kid is stocked in Footlocker, House of Fraser and Sports Direct.  The flagship store is on Fairfax Road in London.

Morgan also set up Fresh Ego FC, the official football team of Fresh Ego Kid, to raise awareness of issues surrounding mental health and racism, engaging local communities and young people to inspire change and raising money for charities to continue their great work.

Death
Morgan died on 6 December 2021, aged 38, due to complications from his cavernoma. Tributes were paid by a number of Morgan's former clubs and fellow footballers. According to his partner, he was on a business trip abroad for his fashion brand.

Career statistics
.

References

External links

1983 births
2021 deaths
Footballers from Manchester
English footballers
Association football forwards
Wealdstone F.C. players
Berkhamsted Town F.C. players
Yeading F.C. players
Woking F.C. players
Aldershot Town F.C. players
Dagenham & Redbridge F.C. players
Shrewsbury Town F.C. players
Plymouth Argyle F.C. players
Hartlepool United F.C. players
Havant & Waterlooville F.C. players
Bath City F.C. players
Hampton & Richmond Borough F.C. players
Hendon F.C. players
Beaconsfield Town F.C. players
Potters Bar Town F.C. players
Wingate & Finchley F.C. players
Hornchurch F.C. players
English Football League players
National League (English football) players
Isthmian League players
Southern Football League players
Black British sportsmen
Businesspeople from Manchester
English fashion designers